North Korea, officially the Democratic People's Republic of Korea, is formally a one-party state under the leadership of the Workers' Party of Korea (WPK) as the sole governing party. There are also two other minor parties served in the Democratic Front for the Reunification of Korea similar to the popular fronts of other communist countries.

As of the latest election in 2019, three parties (WPK, Korean Social Democratic Party, and Chondoist Chongu Party) and one organization (Chongryon) are represented in the Supreme People's Assembly, the country's unicameral parliament.

Current parties

Former parties

Dissolved parties

North Korean opposition parties

There is currently no known organized opposition within North Korea that is independently verifiable. However, there are various exiled dissident groups that oppose the regime.

 Free Joseon
 North Korea Freedom Coalition
 Fighters for a Free North Korea
 North Korean People's Liberation Front

See also

 Democratic Front for the Reunification of the Fatherland
 Elections in North Korea
 Politics of North Korea
 List of ruling political parties by country

References

Works cited

Further reading

North Korea
North Korea
 
Political parties
Political parties